Norman Thompson (5 September 1900–1989) was an English footballer who played in the Football League for Barnsley, Middlesbrough, Nottingham Forest  and South Shields.

References

1900 births
1989 deaths
English footballers
Association football forwards
Newcastle United F.C. players
Gateshead A.F.C. players
Middlesbrough F.C. players
Barnsley F.C. players
Chilton Colliery Recreation F.C. players
York City F.C. players
West Stanley F.C. players
Nottingham Forest F.C. players
Newcastle East End F.C. players
Carlisle United F.C. players
English Football League players